Walking Tall may refer to:

Walking Tall (1973 film), a 1973 film
Walking Tall Part 2, (a.k.a. The Legend of Buford Pusser), a 1975 sequel to Walking Tall
Walking Tall: Final Chapter, a 1977 sequel to Walking Tall Part 2.
A Real American Hero (film), a 1978 made-for-television remake of Walking Tall (1973).
Walking Tall (TV series), a 1981 television series adaptation of the films of the same name
Walking Tall (2004 film), a remake of the 1973 film of the same name
Walking Tall: The Payback, a 2007 sequel to the 2004 film Walking Tall
Walking Tall: Lone Justice, a 2007 sequel to Walking Tall: The Payback

See also
 Walk Tall (disambiguation)
 Standing Tall (disambiguation)